Krapfen may refer to:
 Berliner (doughnut), a German holeless doughnut
 Krofne, a similar doughnut of the Balkan region